1,1-Difluoroethane, or DFE, is an organofluorine compound with the chemical formula CHF. This colorless gas is used as a refrigerant, where it is often listed as R-152a (refrigerant-152a) or HFC-152a (hydrofluorocarbon-152a). It is also used as a propellant for aerosol sprays and in gas duster products. As an alternative to chlorofluorocarbons, it has an ozone depletion potential of zero, a lower global warming potential (124) and a shorter atmospheric lifetime (1.4 years).

Production
1,1-Difluoroethane is a synthetic substance that is produced by the mercury-catalyzed addition of hydrogen fluoride to acetylene:
HCCH  +  2 HF   →   CHCHF
The intermediate in this process is vinyl fluoride (C2H3F), the monomeric precursor to polyvinyl fluoride.

Uses
With a relatively low global warming potential (GWP) index of 124 and favorable thermophysical properties, 1,1-difluoroethane has been proposed as an environmentally friendly alternative to R134a. Despite its flammability, R152a also presents operating pressures and volumetric cooling capacity (VCC) similar to R134a so it can be used in large chillers or in more particular applications like heat pipe finned heat exchangers.

Furthermore, 1,1-difluoroethane is also commonly used in gas dusters and numerous other retail aerosol products, particularly those subject to stringent volatile organic compound (VOC) requirements.

The molecular weight of difluoroethane is 66, making it a useful and convenient tool for detecting vacuum leaks in GC-MS systems. The cheap and freely available gas has a molecular weight and fragmentation pattern (base peak 51 m/z in typical EI-MS, major peak at 65 m/z) distinct from anything in air. If mass peaks corresponding to 1,1-difluoroethane are observed immediately after spraying a suspect leak point, leaks may be identified.

Safety
Difluoroethane is an extremely flammable gas, which decomposes rapidly on heating or burning, producing toxic and irritating fumes, including hydrogen fluoride and carbon monoxide.

Difluoroethane is an intoxicant and precipitates fatal cardiac arrhythmia. Several reports of fatal car crashes have been linked to drivers huffing 1,1-difluoroethane. Actress Skye McCole Bartusiak died due to combined effects of difluoroethane and other drugs. Because of inhalant abuse, a bitterant is added to some brands; however this measure is not legally required and has not prevented widespread use of this product as a drug.

In a DuPont study, rats were exposed to up to 25,000 ppm (67,485 mg/m) for six hours daily, five days a week for two years. This has become the no-observed-adverse-effect level for this substance. Prolonged exposure to 1,1-difluoroethane has been linked in humans to the development of coronary disease and angina.

Environmental abundance 

Most production, use, and emissions of HFC-152a have occurred within Earth's more industrialized and populated northern hemisphere following the substance's introduction in the 1990s. Its concentration in the northern troposphere reached an annual average of about 10 parts per trillion by year 2011. The concentration of HFC-152a in the southern troposphere is about 50% lower due to its removal rate (i.e. lifetime) of about 1.5 years being similar in magnitude to the global atmospheric mixing time of one to two years.

See also
 List of refrigerants
 IPCC list of greenhouse gases
 Canned air

References

Fluoroalkanes
Refrigerants
Greenhouse gases
Organic compounds with 2 carbon atoms